Charles Cochran Kirkpatrick (June 20, 1907 – March 12, 1988) was a rear admiral in the United States Navy who was Superintendent of the United States Naval Academy in Annapolis, Maryland from August 18, 1962 to January 11, 1964. He also held commands of Chief of Staff, U.S. Taiwan Defense Command from 1956 to 1957, Chief of Information for the United States Navy from 1957 to 1960, and Commander Training Command, U.S. Pacific Fleet from 1961 to 1962). Kirkpatrick was due for promotion to vice admiral in 1964, but a heart attack forced him into retirement.

The Admiral, with Walt Disney and Chief Steward Nelson and his family, Dedicated the new submarine ride at Disneyland in 1959. Chief Nelson's wife christened Disney's Nautilus. Then Disney, the Admiral and Chief Steward Nelson and his family sailed the maiden voyage.

Kirkpatrick died in 1988 in Kerrville, Texas.

References

New York Times obituary

1907 births
1988 deaths
Superintendents of the United States Naval Academy
People from San Angelo, Texas
Military personnel from Texas
Recipients of the Navy Cross (United States)
20th-century American academics